Chris Cameron may refer to:

 Chris Cameron (lacrosse), American lacrosse player
 Chris Cameron (gymnast) (born 1989), American artistic gymnast
 Chris Cameron (footballer), Australian rules footballer 
 Chris Cameron (musician), (born 1957) British musician formerly with Hot Chocolate (band)